Priscilla Reuel Tolkien (18 June 1929 – 28 February 2022) was a British literary preservationist who was the youngest child of J. R. R. Tolkien. On her death the ownership of the Tolkien Trust passed to an entity called Fourth Age, Ltd.

Life 
Tolkien was born on 18 June 1929, to J. R. R. Tolkien (1892–1973) and his wife, Edith Tolkien (1889-1971). Tolkien was their youngest child and only daughter.

Tolkien was very devoted to his children and sent them illustrated letters from Father Christmas when they were young.

When Priscilla was 14, she helped her father by typing out some early chapters of Lord of the Rings. The initial name of Frodo Baggins in the fourth draft of The Lord of the Rings was Bingo Bolger-Baggins which was named after a family of toy bears owned by Priscilla. She completed her B.A. degree in English at Lady Margaret Hall, Oxford in 1951.

In July–August 1955, she accompanied her father to a two-week holiday in Italy. After that, she started living in the further side of the Oxford city from her parents' house but still saw them frequently and started working as a probation officer in the city. She was also a social worker.

Tolkien died on 28 February 2022, unmarried, at the age of 92. She was the last living child of J. R. R. Tolkien.

Tolkien legacy 
Tolkien wrote his last letter to Priscilla in August 1973. She was, until her death, the honorary vice-president of the Tolkien Society. She wrote an article titled "My Father the Artist" in December 1976 for Amon Hen, the bulletin of the Tolkien Society. After her eldest brother John returned to Oxford in 1987, the siblings began identifying and cataloging the large collection of family photographs. In 1992, she and John published the book The Tolkien Family Album containing pictures of the Tolkien family to celebrate the 100th birth anniversary of their father. The same year she unveiled a plaque at the Anglican Cathedral of St. Andrew and St. Michael commemorating the centenary birth anniversary celebrations of her father at his birthplace of Bloemfontein, South Africa. She launched the special Tolkien edition Royal Mail stamps commemorating her father's works in February 2004. In 2012, she along with a coalition of British publishers sued Warner Brothers in her capacity of a trustee of The Tolkien Trust for US$80 million accusing them of exploiting Middle-earth characters to promote online gambling.

References 

1929 births
2022 deaths
Tolkien family
Tolkien Society members
People associated with Lady Margaret Hall, Oxford